Gozareshe Varzeshi is an Iranian television program for broadcasting European football on IRIB TV3. The founder and producer of this program is Hossein Zokaei and the host of the program is Reza Javdani. This program broadcasts European league matches as well as examines the events and fringes around European football.

Background 
Gozareshe Varzeshi was founded in 2002 by Hossein Zokeai. The first episode of this program was broadcast on 9 August 2002.

Attributes

Broadcast 
Gozareshe Varzeshi program airs on the day of major European football matches about 10 minutes before the start of the match.

Performance 
The current host of the program is Reza Javdani. Reza Javdani has been the host of the program since 2002 and Mohammad Reza Ahmadi was the host of the program from 2010 to 2020.

Theme

Program process 
Gozareshe Varzeshi program reviews and analyzes European football-related events every week. Typically, the program broadcasts football matches from England, Spain, Germany, Italy, France, UEFA Champions League. Parts of the program also focus on the fringes and news related to European football.

Program sections 
 Broadcast matches:
This program broadcasts important European football games.
 Poll:
Viewers of the program can participate in the match reporter evaluation poll on the official Telegram channel of Gozareshe Varzeshi after each match.
 Items:
This section features items from European football teams, players and coaches.
 European football news:
A summary of the most important European football news is reviewed in this section.
 Thematic documentaries:
In this program, depending on the events of the past week (or future), short documentaries and sometimes with literary text will be broadcast. Usually, these documentaries cover not only football but also social and cultural issues.
 Pre-match:
In this section, a review of the conditions of the teams organizing the match in the previous weeks, a statistical review with a historical perspective is done.
 Review of European football newspapers:
This program usually examines the headlines of prestigious European football newspapers, including the football newspapers of England, Spain and Italy.

List of competitions

Margins

Censoring the A.S. Roma logo 
In the pre-match between FC Barcelona and A.S. Roma in the 2017–18 UEFA Champions League, which ended in a 4–1 victory for the Catalans, the logo of A.S. Roma team (breastfeeding a wolf to two children) was censored, which had a global impact and even provoked a reaction from virtual users. And even caused the A.S. Roma team to create its own Persian page on Twitter to communicate with Persian-speaking fans.

References

External links 
 
 

Association football on television
Football in Iran
2002 Iranian television series debuts
2000s Iranian television series
2010s Iranian television series
Association football television series
Islamic Republic of Iran Broadcasting original programming